Androsthenes (literally meaning: "Man's Strength") of Thasos, son of Callistratus, was one of the admirals of Alexander the Great. He sailed as a trierarch with Nearchus, and was also sent by Alexander down the Euphrates to explore the coast of the Persian Gulf, skirting the coast of Arabia in a triacontor and sailing farther than Archias of Pella. He wrote an account of this voyage, titled The Navigation of the Indian sea (''').

Notes

 

Trierarchs of Nearchus' fleet
Geographers of Alexander the Great
Admirals of Alexander the Great
Ancient Thasians
Settlers in Amphipolis
Ancient Greek geographers
Ancient Greek explorers
4th-century BC Greek people
Historians who accompanied Alexander the Great
Explorers of Arabia
4th-century BC geographers